Queen Sasuk of the Incheon Yi clan (1065 – 1107) was a Korean queen consort as the second wife of her first cousin, King Seonjong of Goryeo and the mother of his successor, King Heonjong. She was the Regent of Korea during the minority of her son between 1094 and 1095. Both of Princess Wonsin, Princess Janggyeong, Yi Ja-gyeom, and Yi Ja-ryang were her first cousin while Lady Jeongsin was her first cousin once removed.

Biography

Marriage and Palace life
She married Seonjong (2nd son of her aunt, Queen Inye) when he was still Duke Gukwon (국원공) and then became Concubine of Duke Gukwon (국원공빈, 國原公賓) firstly, but after his 1st wife's death, she formally became Duchess Consort Gukwon (국원공비, 國原公妃) and lived in Duke's manor (공부, 公府) until his ascension. In 1083, he ascended the throne and following this, she was given royal title as Consort Yeonhwa (연화궁비, 延和宮妃) while lived in "Yeonhwa Palace" (연화궁, 延和宮). They later had a son in June 1084 and 2 daughter. But, misfortune befell on them with their eldest daughter died too early after birth and the other daughter was born blind and would not have a chance to marry.

Regency and death
Meanwhile, King Seonjong eventually died in 1094 due to his illness and their only young-son became the new King, Heonjong. Since the new king was still 11 years old at this time, so as his mother, Yi then became and acting as his regent with presided over and executed all government affairs including military and administrative affairs. As a queen mother, she moved to Yeongnyeong Mansion (영녕부, 永寧府) in Junghwa Hall (중화전, 中和殿) from her reigned day on 1 June in order to purpose the strengthening of the royal power. In other words, she went directly to the court and observed the court affairs, also her orders was "Je" (제, 制) that corresponded to the King's orders and commands.

In 1095, Duke Gyerim became the new King after took over the young King's throne while under such circumstances, the queen mother's cousin, Yi Ja-ui (이자의) must lost his life after tried to revolt against Gyerim by made Wang Yun ascended the throne. The young king was abdicated to his uncle after 1 year 5 months reigned, her official residence was closed under Gyerim's command and her power was completely cut off. Together with her son, they returned to her old palace where the late king stayed in when he was still a Duke.

In "Heungseong Palace" (흥성궁, 興盛宮), they two lived quietly and Heonjong died 2 years later in 1097. From this time, she was described as living a life of virtue, although she became more lonely than before, and was said to have lived a life without problems until her death in around 1107 at 42/3 years old. Then, she was enshrined in her husband's shrine.

After life
King Sukjong's eldest son, King Yejong buried her in Illeung tomb, Gaeseong along with her husband and held her ritual. She was said to had been suffered a lot after her son's deposition from the throne during the reign of King Sukjong. When King Yejong discussed about enshrined Consort Jeongsin in Seonjong's tomb, the officials said,

From this point, it can be seen that Yi played a certain role as the spouse of Duke Gukwon and in Goryeosa, (임조칭제, 臨朝稱制; Imjochingje) referred to the political power of the Queen Mother which she used for her regency on behalf of the young-weak King. She was seen to exerted her political influence when she was a regent.

Some peoples said,

Posthumous name
In April 1140 (18th year reign of King Injong), name Jeong-hwa (정화, 貞和) was added.
In October 1253 (40th year reign of King Gojong), name Gwang-suk (광숙, 匡肅) was added to her Posthumous name too.

References

External links
Queen Sasuk on Encykorea 
사숙태후 on Doosan Encyclopedia .

Royal consorts of the Goryeo Dynasty
Korean queens consort
1060s births
1100s deaths
Year of birth uncertain
Year of death uncertain
11th-century Korean women
11th-century Korean people
12th-century Korean women
12th-century Korean people
Incheon Lee clan
11th-century women rulers
Regents of Korea